The 2016 Wuhan Open (also known as the 2016 Dongfeng Motor Wuhan Open for sponsorship reasons) was a women's tennis tournament played on outdoor hard courts between September 25 and October 1, 2016. It was the 3rd edition of the Wuhan Open, and part of the WTA Premier 5 tournaments of the 2016 WTA Tour. The tournament was held at the Optics Valley International Tennis Center in Wuhan, China.

Points and prize money

Point distribution

Prize money

Singles main-draw entrants

Seeds

 Rankings are as of September 19, 2016

Other entrants
The following players received wild cards into the main singles draw:
  Sabine Lisicki 
  Peng Shuai 
  Zheng Saisai

The following players received entry from the singles qualifying draw:
  Louisa Chirico 
  Alizé Cornet 
  Julia Görges 
  Daria Kasatkina 
  Elizaveta Kulichkova
  Bethanie Mattek-Sands 
  Kateřina Siniaková 
  Heather Watson

Withdrawals
Before the tournament
  Kiki Bertens → replaced by  Yaroslava Shvedova
  Eugenie Bouchard → replaced by  Shelby Rogers
  Anna-Lena Friedsam → replaced by  Daria Gavrilova
  Ana Ivanovic → replaced by  Zhang Shuai
  Andrea Petkovic → replaced by  Anastasija Sevastova
  Sloane Stephens → replaced by  Madison Brengle
  Elena Vesnina → replaced by  Caroline Wozniacki
  Serena Williams → replaced by  Mirjana Lučić-Baroni

Retirements
  Timea Bacsinszky (Viral illness)
  Irina-Camelia Begu (Rib injury)
  Belinda Bencic (Low back injury)
  Anastasia Pavlyuchenkova (Viral illness)
  Anastasija Sevastova (Right shoulder injury)
  Heather Watson (Gastrointestinal illness)

Doubles main-draw entrants

Seeds

 Rankings are as of September 19, 2016

Other entrants
The following pair received wildcards into the doubles main draw:
  Timea Bacsinszky /  Svetlana Kuznetsova
  Simona Halep /  Jeļena Ostapenko
  Han Xinyun /  Zhu Lin
  Liu Chang /  Zhang Kailin

The following pair received entry as alternates:
  Alizé Cornet /  Pauline Parmentier

Withdrawals
Before the tournament
  Irina-Camelia Begu

Retirements

Champions

Singles

  Petra Kvitová def.  Dominika Cibulková, 6–1, 6–1

Doubles

  Bethanie Mattek-Sands /  Lucie Šafářová def.  Sania Mirza /  Barbora Strýcová, 6–1, 6–4.

References

External links
 Official website

 
2016 WTA Tour
2016 in Chinese tennis
2016 in Chinese women's sport
September 2016 sports events in China
October 2016 sports events in China